John or Jack Condon may refer to:

 John Condon (boxer) (1889–1919), British bantamweight professional boxer
 John Condon (British Army soldier) (1896–1915), previously thought to be the youngest British soldier killed in the First World War
 John F. Condon (Lindbergh kidnapping), hired by Charles Lindbergh in 1932
 John F. Condon (fl. 1883), American college football coach
 John Condon (hurler) (1872–1944), Irish hurler
 John P. Condon (1911–1996), aviator in the United States Marine Corps
 Jack Condon (1903–1967), tennis player from South Africa
 Jack Condon (footballer) (1922–2015), Australian rules footballer